Jerry Louis Maygarden (born December 22, 1948) is  a former American politician who served as a member of the Florida House of Representatives from 1994 to 2002. A member of the Republican Party, he previously served as the 55th Mayor of Pensacola from 1991 to 1994.

Politics
Maygarden was a member of the Pensacola City Council from 1985 to 1992, and was Mayor Pro Tempore of Pensacola from 1989 to 1991. Maygarden was Mayor Pro Tempor at the time of Vince Whibbs' retirement from the office, causing him  to become Mayor. Maygarden also served as a member of the Florida House of Representatives 1994 to 2002.

He received some notoriety during the Florida election recount imbroglio by stating during a rally in Pensacola: "We've come together to express our collective concerns over the manner in which our votes are being systematically devalued in favor of dangling chads, pregnant chads and dimpled chads. Well, they can kiss my chad."

After his tenure in elected office, Maygarden re-entered the private sphere, working as a health care industry executive and spokesperson. He advocated publicly against comprehensive healthcare reform at the federal level.

Biography

Education
Maygarden received an AA in liberal arts from Pensacola Junior College in 1972, a BA in Communication Arts in 1974 and an MA in the same cum laude in 1975 from the University of West Florida in 1974.

Employment
He served in the United States Navy and served with the Navy Riverine Forces in the Mekong Delta during the Vietnam War.

See also
 Pensacola, Florida
 Pensacola City Council
 Mayor of Pensacola
 List of mayors of Pensacola, Florida

References

External links
 Official profile

1948 births
Living people
Mayors of Pensacola, Florida
Republican Party members of the Florida House of Representatives
University of West Florida alumni
Pensacola Junior College alumni
United States Navy officers
United States Navy personnel of the Vietnam War